Frank H. Murray

John B. Goodman, a Houston, Texas native is a multi-millionaire and polo player whose wealth originates  in the family appliance and air conditioning businesses and became more widely known in the United States for his legal difficulties stemming from a manslaughter conviction in 2012.

John Bailey Goodman was one of four children, born into a wealthy Texas family, 18 September 1963. His father, Harold V. Goodman, amassed a fortune in air conditioning manufacturing and also raised race horses.

From his Massachusetts boarding school, he attended a Delaware college. After attending Wesley College, Goodman came back home to Texas to help run the family business," wrote the Post's Randall Patterson in 1998.

Upon returning home, Goodman worked for the family business in a variety of different positions, starting as its President of International Sales. He ultimately served as President and Chairman of Goodman Global Holding, Inc. The company grew to become the largest privately held air conditioning and heating equipment manufacturer in the United States.

The manufacturing company, a little-known but well positioned company, had been started in 1975 and run by Harold V. Goodman since its inception. It was launched by the elder Goodman based on his decades of experience as an air conditioning contractor and concentrated on making flexible ducts. John Goodman was a board member when then Chairman and CEO Frank H. Murray purchased Amana from Raytheon in 1997, then sold its microwave and appliance divisions to Maytag in 2001 for a reported $325 million. The son was given control of the company before his father's death in 1995. In 1996 the company hired Frank H. Murray to become Chairman and CEO, a role which he held until the end of 1999.

John Goodman sold the company in 2004 for approximately $1.43 billion. At the time, it was the second largest air conditioning manufacturer in the United States.

Personal life

Goodman married Isla Carroll Reckling in December 1986. Her family has ties to Exxon oil. She is a descendant of Frank Sterling and philanthropist Isla Carroll Sterling Turner. The couple, who have two children, became estranged and originally filed for divorce in 2005, but reconciled. The Goodmans' divorce was finalized in November 2008 after 22 years of marriage.

Involvement in polo
In about 1989, Goodman took up the sport of polo. Goodman became a member of the United States Polo Association in 1989. He was also a member of board of directors of the Houston Polo Club and served as its president in 1994 and 1995.

Goodman was also founder of the International Polo Club Palm Beach in Wellington, Florida. The club, which opened in 2004, regularly hosts tournaments during the polo season, including the U.S. Open Polo Championship. He told Palm Beach Life in 2004 that the club was specifically designed to attract South American players as well as wealthy individuals and celebrities from nearby Miami and Palm Beach.

He was the Patron on the Isla Carroll Polo Team, which he owned and founded. The organization was named after his wife. The team roster has included elite-ranked players such as Memo Gracida, Nacho Figueras, Owen Rinehart, and Todd Offen. (His estate is called Isla Carroll as well.)

Goodman was also involved in publishing. He provided start up funds for Cowboys & Indians magazine, later becoming sole owner of Westchester Media. The company also published Polo, the official publication of the United States Polo Association. The publication was tangled in a lengthy lawsuit with Ralph Lauren concerning brand confusion.

Conviction of DUI Manslaughter
Goodman gained notoriety following a DUI manslaughter arrest after involvement in a hit-and-run automobile collision on February 12, 2010 at about 1:00 AM, while under the influence of alcohol. He was driving his car near the polo club he founded when he disregarded a stop sign and collided with a car driven by Scott Patrick Wilson, 23. Goodman left the scene of the accident without calling emergency services.  Wilson's car ended up overturned in a canal and he drowned. Goodman broke his wrist. Goodman hired well-known criminal defense attorney, Roy Black, best known for high-profile trials involving William Kennedy Smith and Rush Limbaugh.

While testifying in the criminal case, Goodman said his car malfunctioned, which was the cause of the crash. He denied being drunk or under the influence of drugs; however, his blood alcohol level was more than twice the legal limit three hours after the crash.

He was found guilty of DUI manslaughter and vehicular homicide in March 2012. In May 2012, Goodman was sentenced to 16 years in prison and fined $10,000.

Judge Jeffrey Colbath stated that Goodman could be released on a $7 million bond pending his appeal. Among the varied conditions of his release, Goodman would be monitored 24 hours a day with a GPS device and cannot apply for a new passport. His driver's license was also permanently revoked. Goodman would remain under house arrest. The court granted Goodman a new trial in May 2013 due to juror misconduct.

After a retrial, Goodman was again convicted of DUI manslaughter and on November 21, 2014, was again sentenced to 16 years in prison.  Prison credit was denied for 810 days spent on house arrest pending the second trial.  He was also denied bail pending his second appeal.  In 2017, the Florida Court of Appeals affirmed his conviction for DUI manslaughter.

References

 "John Goodman: Executive Profile," Businessweek, http://investing.businessweek.com/research/stocks/private/person.asp?personId=834785&privcapId=834783&previousCapId=834783&previousTitle=Goodman%20Manufacturing%20Company,%20L.P. Accessed 15 October 2012.
 http://virtualglobetrotting.com/map/john-goodmans-house-3/  Accessed 15 October 2012.
http://www.palmbeachpost.com/news/news/car-driven-by-international-polo-founder-kills-23-/nL4b8/ Accessed 15 October 2012.
Palm Beach Life, Spring 2004, pp. 74–75, 86.
https://abcnews.go.com/US/florida-polo-tycoon-john-goodman-sentenced-16-years/story?id=16327312
http://www.palmbeachpost.com/news/news/crime-law/adoption-of-adult-girlfriend-might-cost-millionair/nL3nb/ Accessed 15 October 2012.
https://news.yahoo.com/john-goodman-manslaughter-adopting-girlfriend-180000651.html Accessed 15 October 2012.
http://www.leagle.com/xmlResult.aspx?page=2&xmldoc=19991038103FSupp2d935_1953.xml&docbase=CSLWAR2-1986-2006&SizeDisp=7  Accessed 15 October 2012.
 D Magazine http://www.dmagazine.com/Home/1998/01/01/Pulse_OF_THE_City.aspx
 http://www.bizjournals.com/dallas/stories/1998/11/23/newscolumn6.html?page=all
http://blogs.houstonpress.com/hairballs/2010/02/goodman_divorce_cocaine.php
 http://blogs.houstonpress.com/hairballs/2010/02/billionaire_bentley_folo.php
http://www.houstonpress.com/1998-11-19/news/the-patron/1/
 https://www.nytimes.com/2012/02/14/us/in-florida-polo-country-a-tale-of-death-money-and-adoption.html?pagewanted=all&_r=0
 Broward Palm Beach New Times, http://blogs.browardpalmbeach.com/pulp/2010/02/john_goodman_international_polo_club_crash.php
 http://www.newyorksocialdiary.com/node/1907888
 "Will a Multimillionaire Polo Mogul Be Punished for a Fatal Drunken Accident?," Lisa Rab
Jul 8 2010, Broward Palm Beach New Times, http://www.browardpalmbeach.com/2010-07-08/news/sudden-death/  Accessed 15 October 2012.

1963 births
Living people
Businesspeople from Houston
American industrialists
American polo players
American people convicted of manslaughter
American businesspeople convicted of crimes
Wealth in the United States